Malaysian Federal Roads System, is the main national road network in Malaysia. All Federal Roads in Malaysia are under the purview of the Ministry of Works (MOW). According to the Ministerial Functions Act 1969, the MOW is responsible to plan, build and maintain all Federal Roads gazetted under the Federal Roads Act 1959. However, most of the Federal roads' projects were built and maintained by the Malaysian Public Works Department (JKR), which is also one of the implementing agencies under the MOW (with the exception of Sabah and Sarawak, whereby JKR in these two states is under respective state government).

History

Most of the federal roads in Peninsular Malaysia were built during the British colonial era before 1957. At that time, the British government built the roads in order to enable them to transport goods and commodities easier.

In Sabah, most of the federal roads were built during the occupation of British North Borneo under North Borneo Chartered Company administration, and unlike most federal roads in Peninsular Malaysia which uses only numbers to label federal roads, Sabah federal road codes begin with the letter A followed by route number.

However, in Sarawak, no road network system was developed during the rule of White Rajah Brooke dynasty. As a result, right after Sarawak joined the federation of Malaysia on 16 September 1963, the federal government of Malaysia began to build a road network system connecting Sarawak to Sabah, known as Pan Borneo Highway.

Federal road standards

Overview
According to Malaysian Road Statistics 2021 by Public Works Department (JKR) Malaysia.
(Source: Malaysian Road Statistics 2021)

Federal routes are labeled with only numbers, for example Federal Route 1, while state routes are labeled with the state code letter followed by assigned numbers; for example Route (J)32 is a Johor state road. However, federal route numbers can also be added with the
FT- prefix, which is normally used by JKR and Malaysian police. For example, Federal Route 1 can also be written as Federal Route FT1. Both federal and state roads have blue road signs and the text colour is white.

Most of the federal roads in Malaysia are two-lane roads. Malaysia implements a right-hand driving system where drivers drive on the left side of the road. However, there are in certain places where additional lanes are available. In town areas, federal roads may become four-lane roads to increase traffic capacity. In hilly areas, additional third climbing lane is available for slower vehicles such as buses and lorries.

Some federal roads may have motorcycle lanes. On Malaysian federal roads, the motorcycle lanes are placed at the extreme left side of each direction and only separated from the main lanes by black-and-white stripes to enable motorcyclists to overtake slower motorcycles and to turn right to exit the road.

Some expressways in Malaysia such as Federal Highway and Skudai Highway are federally funded, therefore all federally funded expressways are also classified as federal roads.

Nearly all federal roads are paved with typical tarmac except Skudai-Pontian Highway  which is paved with concrete from Universiti Teknologi Malaysia interchange to Taman Sri Pulai junction and Sitiawan–Batak Rabit road (Federal route 5) from Sitiawan to Kota Setia. Meanwhile, at Federal Highway linking Klang to Kuala Lumpur, the section of the highway from Subang Jaya to Kota Darul Ehsan near Petaling Jaya are paved with asphalt.

Sarawak has some of the most extensive federal road network in Malaysia. All federal roads in Sarawak is connecting main divisions with exception of Mukah division. As for Kapit division, the only federal road serving this division is Jalan Bakun (starting from KM 95–KM 120). Coastal road of Bintulu–Miri is a still in dispute between federal government and state government right of maintenance. It is due to the construction is federal funded, but the compensation and acquisition of land are from Sarawak state government. No federal roads are isolated from the network unlike state roads. Uniquely in Sarawak, federal road network is adjoined internationally to Brunei highway at Sungai Tujuh (Miri) with Kuala Belait (Brunei), Tedungan (Limbang) with Kuala Lurah (Brunei), Limbang with Puni (Brunei), Lawas with Labu (Brunei) and also to Indonesian road network at Tebedu (Serian district) with Entikong (Kalimantan Barat, Indonesia).

Malaysian federal roads are subject to the rural highway standard adopted by Malaysian Public Works Department (JKR), ranging from R1 and R1a (minor roads at villages and FELDA settlements with no access control and low speed limits) to R5 (federal roads or highways with limited access control and speed limits up to 90 km/h). R6 standard is exclusive for high-speed (up to 110 km/h) expressways with full access control.

Type of federal roads and route number categories

Main federal roads
Mostly found at Peninsula Malaysia, Sabah and Sarawak.

FELDA/FELCRA federal roads
Mostly found at FELDA and FELCRA settlements in Peninsula Malaysia only. The road was built by FELDA or FELCRA and JKR.

In Sarawak, federal roads for FELDA is in Lundu and for SALCRA is in Sarikei.

Industrial federal roads
Mostly found at the industrial areas in Peninsula Malaysia only.

In Sarawak, there are two industrial federal roads, which are located at Pending Industrial Estate in Kuching and Kidurong Industrial Estate in Bintulu.

Institutional facilities federal roads

Mostly found at the entrance to the federal institutional facilities such as university, institute, military bases, satellite earth stations, airports, TV and radio frequency stations, telecom exchange stations, hospitals and tourist attractions.

Road design

Rural

Urban

* - Total width of 2-way road

(Source: Arahan Teknik (Jalan) 8/86 - A Guide on Geometric Design of Roads, Jabatan Kerja Raya Malaysia)

Asian Highway Network

Asian Highway Network is an international project between Asian nations to develop their highway systems which will form the main routes in the Asian Highway network. There are 7 Asian Highway routes passing through Malaysia - AH2, AH18, AH140, AH141, AH142, AH143, and AH150.

The Malaysian section of Route AH2 consists of:-
 North–South Expressway
 New Klang Valley Expressway
 North–South Expressway Central Link
 Federal Route 1
 Johor Bahru Eastern Dispersal Link Expressway
 Johor Causeway

The Malaysian section of Route AH18 consists of:-
 Federal Route 3
 Kuantan Bypass
 Johor Bahru–Kota Tinggi Highway

The Malaysian section of Route AH140 consists of:-
 Butterworth–Kulim Expressway
 East–West Highway
 Federal Route 4

The Malaysian section of Route AH141 consists of:-
 North Klang Straits Bypass and New North Klang Straits Bypass
 New Klang Valley Expressway
 Duta–Ulu Klang Expressway
 Kuala Lumpur Middle Ring Road 2
 Kuala Lumpur–Karak Expressway
 East Coast Expressway
 Gebeng Bypass

The Malaysian section of Route AH142 consists of:-
 MEC Highway
 Tun Razak Highway
 Federal Route 1

The Malaysian section of Route AH143 consists of:-
 Second Link Expressway
 Malaysia–Singapore Second Crossing

The Malaysian section of Route AH150 consists of:-
 Pan Borneo Highway
 Miri–Baram Highway

Federal road maintenances

Before early 2000, the Malaysian federal roads were maintained by the Public Works Department. Beginning in 2000, the main contractors and maintenance company have the responsibility to maintain all federal roads in Malaysia.

Safety

Speed limits
Speed traps are also deployed by the Malaysian police at many places along the federal roads.

Accidents
Malaysian federal roads are always sites of most of the road accidents in Malaysia, especially during festive seasons.

During festive seasons
During festive seasons such as Chinese New Year, Deepavali, Christmas and Hari Raya Aidilfitri, activities such as construction, road repairs and maintenance works have been stopped. Meanwhile, a heavy goods vehicles such as logging truck, cement truck, intermodal container truck, construction materials truck and other heavy goods vehicles (except tanker lorry, provision goods truck, road crane crane, tow truck, fire engine, ambulance, etc.) are banned from using roads, highways and expressways during festive seasons. A massive nationwide operation known as Ops Selamat (Previously named as Ops Sikap) are held annually by the Malaysian police to ensure safety on all roads in Malaysia during festive seasons.

Automated Enforcement System 
The Automated Enforcement System (AES) is the road safety enforcement system to monitor all federal roads, highways and expressways in Malaysia. This system came into effect on 22 September 2012.

Type of AES
Speed light camera
Red light camera

Natural hazards
The Public Works Department has monitored all federal roads in Malaysia and make sure that no landslides, flash floods and other natural hazards may happen again.

Facilities on the Malaysian federal roads
Rest and Service Area and Restaurant and Rest Plaza – These facilities can be found at all federal roads such as Batak Rabit, Temerloh, Bandar Al-Muktafi Billah Shah and Mersing.
U-turn – These U-turns can be found at the dual carriageway road.
JKR Road Complaint Hotline – These services can be found at all signboards along federal roads.
Road Transport Department (JPJ) Enforcement Stations – These stations can be found at all federal roads. These JPJ enforcement stations have weighing bridges to detect heavy vehicles.
Police Watch Tower – These towers can be found at all federal roads in Malaysia to monitored traffic situations during festive seasons.
Pedestrian bridge – These bridge can be found at schools, institutional facilities and towns.
Traffic lights – These yellow light can be found at the junctions and intersections.
Warning lights – These yellow light can be found at the hazardous and accident areas.
Automated Enforcement System (AES) – These systems can be found at accident-prone areas and the red-light camera at traffic light junctions.
Kilometre Post Monument – These monument usually found opposite the Pos Malaysia post office in the town.

Other facts
 The Pan Borneo Highway is the longest federal road system in Malaysia, with the total length of 1047.18 km (length measured from Sematan, Kuching to Sungai Tujuh, Miri). If measured from Sematan (Sarawak) to Serudong (Sabah), the total length is estimated to be 1900 km (excluding Brunei stretch of Pan Borneo Highway).
 Federal Routes 1, 77, 76, 5, 24 and 3 were main routes for Japanese Imperial forces from Thailand to Singapore during the Battle of Malaya between 1941 and 1942. There are many abandoned World War II-era bunkers along the roads.
 The Federal Route 1 is the earliest federal road in Malaysia and also the longest federal road in Peninsular Malaysia. Sarawak Federal Route is also labelled as no.1, with same signage.
 The service roads of Persiaran Raja Muda Musa (Route 2), labeled as 2A and 2B, are the only service roads designated as federal roads.
 Jalan Gunung Brinchang route 432 is the highest federal road and also the highest motorable road in Malaysia.
The Tanjung Malim–Slim River tolled road (Federal Route 1) is the first tolled highway in Malaysia.
The Sultan Yahya Petra Bridge (Federal Route 3) is the first tolled bridge in Malaysia.
 Jalan Sitiawan–Batak Rabit and Skudai–Pontian Highway (both on Federal Route 5) are the only federal roads paved with concrete. Meanwhile, the section of Federal Highway Route 2 from Subang Jaya to Kota Darul Ehsan is paved with asphalt.
Putrajaya–Cyberjaya Expressway route 29 is the first future federal highway on Multimedia Super Corridor (MSC).
The biggest cloverleaf federal highway interchange in Malaysia is Bulatan Darul Ehsan of Federal Highway route 2 in Shah Alam, Selangor.
 While most major airports in Malaysia have only one federal access road for each airport, there are two airports being served by more than one federal roads, namely the Kuala Lumpur International Airport (KLIA) and the Langkawi International Airport. The KLIA is being served by KLIA Expressway route 26, KLIA Outer Ring Road route 27, Putrajaya–Cyberjaya Expressway route 29, Jalan KLIA 1 route 182 and Jalan Masjid KLIA route 341, while the Langkawi International Airport is being served by Jalan Lapangan Terbang Langkawi 1 route 105 and Jalan Lapangan Terbang Langkawi 2 route 168.
Langkawi Island and Labuan Island are a main island in Malaysia have a lot of federal roads.
Sarawak is connected to Brunei and Indonesia via its vast federal road networks. However, Sarawak is the only state with missing link in its main federal road trunk, which is at Sungai Pandaruan which separates Sarawak district of Limbang and Brunei district of Temburong. However, there is no missing link between Kuching and Miri, as well as from Brunei district of Temburong to Lawas then up to Tawau in Sabah.
There is one bailey bridge in Sarawak federal trunk road, which is also the narrowest bridge in federal road network system in Malaysia, crossing Batang Merapok at Lawas, Sarawak.
There is one semi tunnel on the East–West Highway (Route 4) from Gerik, Perak to Jeli, Kelantan. It is probably the only one of its type in Malaysia.

List of federal roads

See also
Road signs in Malaysia
National Speed Limits
Malaysian Expressway System
Malaysian State Roads system
Highway
United States Numbered Highways

References

External links
 Ministry of Works (Malaysia)
 Malaysian Public Works Department 
 FEDERAL ROADS (WEST MALAYSIA) (AMENDMENT) based on ACT 376 - Federal Roads Act 1959
 Malaysian Road Signs Information Brochure

Malaysian Federal Roads
Malaysian Public Works Department
Roads in Malaysia